Kim Refshammer (14 September 1955 – 25 February 2002) was a Danish cyclist. He competed in the team pursuit event at the 1976 Summer Olympics.

References

External links
 

1955 births
2002 deaths
Danish male cyclists
Olympic cyclists of Denmark
Cyclists at the 1976 Summer Olympics
Cyclists from Copenhagen